Erik August Larsson (12 April 1912 – 10 March 1982) was a Swedish cross-country skier who competed in the 1930s. He won two medals at the 1936 Winter Olympics in Garmisch-Partenkirchen with a gold in the 18 km and a bronze in the 4 × 10 km relay. The same year he was awarded the Svenska Dagbladet Gold Medal. Larsson also won a bronze in the 4 × 10 km relay at the 1935 FIS Nordic World Ski Championships.

Larsson was born as the second youngest of six siblings in a religious Finnish-speaking family. In 1935, he started working as a cleaner at the Kiruna iron ore mine in the summer and as a lumberjack in the winter. In 1939, after attending a prayer meeting in Kurravaara he gave up his sport career and became a Laestadian Christian. He was later a preacher in the Firstborn Laestadian congregation in Kiruna. His son Lars became a preacher in Luleå, while his granddaughter Åsa Larsson was a tax lawyer and a writer of crime novels.

Cross-country skiing results
All results are sourced from the International Ski Federation (FIS).

Olympic Games
 2 medals – (1 gold, 1 bronze)

World Championships
 1 medal – (1 bronze)

References

External links
 

1912 births
1982 deaths
People from Kiruna Municipality
Swedish male cross-country skiers
Cross-country skiers at the 1936 Winter Olympics
Olympic gold medalists for Sweden
Olympic bronze medalists for Sweden
Olympic medalists in cross-country skiing
FIS Nordic World Ski Championships medalists in cross-country skiing
Medalists at the 1936 Winter Olympics
Swedish Lutherans
20th-century Lutherans